The  IIFA Sound Recording is a technical award chosen ahead of the International Indian Film Academy Awards ceremonies.

The winners are listed below:

See also 
 IIFA Awards
 Bollywood
 Cinema of India

External links
 2008 winners 

International Indian Film Academy Awards